Hafnon is a hafnium nesosilicate mineral, chemical formula  or . In natural zircon  part of the zirconium is replaced by the very similar hafnium and so natural zircon is never pure . A zircon with 100% hafnium substitution can be made synthetically and is hafnon.

Hafnon occurs as transparent red to red orange tetragonal crystals with a hardness of 7.5.

Hafnon occurs naturally in tantalum-bearing granite pegmatites in the Zambezia district, Mozambique and in
weathered pegmatites at Mount Holland, Western Australia. It has also been reported from locations in Ontario, Quebec and Manitoba, Canada; North Carolina, United States; and in Zimbabwe.

References

Emsley, John. Nature's Building Blocks. Oxford, 2001. 

Nesosilicates
Tetragonal minerals
Minerals in space group 141